Muhammad Hilman bin Norhisam (born 24 May 2004) is a Singaporean footballer currently playing as a midfielder for Albirex Niigata Singapore.

Career statistics

Club

Notes

International Statistics

U19 International caps

References

2004 births
Living people
Singaporean footballers
Association football midfielders
Singapore Premier League players
Albirex Niigata Singapore FC players